Zheng Jie was the defending champion, but did not compete this year.

Michaëlla Krajicek won the title by defeating Iveta Benešová 6–2, 6–1 in the final.

Seeds

Draw

Finals

Top half

Bottom half

References
 Main and Qualifying Draws

2006 Moorilla Hobart International